Through the Years is a compilation album by Danish thrash metal band Artillery, released on 10 September 2007 through Metal Mind Records. It is a four-CD collector's box set containing all four of Artillery's studio releases prior to their 2007 reunion (Fear of Tomorrow, Terror Squad, By Inheritance, and B.A.C.K.). It also has a 32-page booklet, all the lyrics printed, and the songs are remastered using a 24-bit process on gold discs. Each disc has multiple bonus tracks.  

There is a pressing error in the track listing of this box set: on the By Inheritance album, the first bonus track is named as a demo of "Khomaniac", but is actually the same version of "Too Late to Regret" also featured as a bonus track on the Terror Squad album. The song is now available as a free download and streaming on the official Artillery website.

Track listing

References

External links

2007 compilation albums
Artillery (band) albums
Thrash metal compilation albums
it:Through the Years